North Dinuba is an unincorporated community in Tulare County, California, United States. It homes Washington Intermediate School and John F. Kennedy Elementary.

References

Unincorporated communities in Tulare County, California
Unincorporated communities in California